Geneviève-Adélaïde Gosselin (1791 – 17 June 1818, Paris) was a French ballet dancer known for being the first dancer en pointe.

Early life
Geneviève Gosselin was the daughter of a ballet master and was also the eldest sister of three other famous ballerinas of Ballet de l’Opera de Paris. Her sister Constance Gosselin was the wife of the dancer Auguste-Anatole Petit. Another sister, Louis Gosselin, was a premier dancer in London and Paris and her other sister, Henriette Gosselin, danced with the Paris Opera from 1821 to 1830.

Ballet career
Geneviève studied under Jean-François Coulon, who was one of the most renowned teachers in Europe at the time. He became professor of the "classe de perfectionnement" at the Opéra de Paris in 1807 and also helped in the production of pointe shoes after 1810. Gosselin joined the Opéra de Paris in 1806 at the age of fifteen. She had excellent technique and was the first dancer to develop the art of being en pointe in 1813.

In 1815 she was cast as the heroine in Flore et Zéphire, one of the first romantic ballets of the time. The ballet was choreographed by Charles Didelot, the chief choreographer of the Russian Imperial Ballet. Didelot had created a "flying machine", instituting the use of cables and wires to give the appearance of weightlessness. Because of his invention, Geneviève Gosselin could perform in pointe shoes. This was the first appearance of dancers en pointe.  Gosselin was only able to balance for brief moments on the pointe shoes (although one critic says that she balanced for one minute). Gosselin paved the way for Amalia Brugnoli and Marie Taglioni, who often gets most of the credit for starting the pointe shoe trend. In fact, a critic of the era, cited that Marie Taglioni reminded him of Gosselin. Geneviève Gosselin died at the age of 27 in 1818, just three years after her appearance en pointe.

1791 births
1818 deaths
French ballerinas
19th-century French ballet dancers
Gosselin
Deputies of the 14th National Assembly of the French Fifth Republic
Members of Parliament for Manche